Margo F. Jonker is an American softball coach and the current head coach of the Central Michigan Chippewas. She was a 2003 inductee in the National Fastpitch Coaches Association Hall of Fame.

Career
During her 31 years as head coach, the Chippewas have gone to the NCAA tournament 13 times and have 11 Mid-American Conference (MAC) titles. Jonker was formerly an assistant softball coach at Grand Valley State University and head coach at West Ottawa High School. CMU's Margo Jonker stadium is named after her.

At the 2000 Olympics she served as an assistant coach on the United States Olympic softball team that captured the gold medal in Sydney, Australia.

She is a Holland, Michigan native and attended and played softball for the Grand Valley State Lakers.

Head coaching record

Volleyball

Softball

See also
List of college softball coaches with 1,000 wins

References

Grand Valley State Lakers softball players
Living people
Female sports coaches
American softball coaches
Year of birth missing (living people)
Grand Valley State Lakers softball coaches
Central Michigan Chippewas softball coaches
United States women's national softball team coaches